Apera spica-venti, the loose silky-bent or common windgrass, is an annual or biannual plant  in the genus Apera. It belongs to the family Poaceae.

This species is native to Eurasia and North Africa from the Canary Islands to Denmark to Yakutia. It occurs in pastures with sandy soil.

It has naturalized in the United States, Canada, and Russian Far East.

References

Pooideae
Grasses of Africa
Grasses of Asia
Grasses of Europe
Taxa named by Carl Linnaeus